Lizbeth Yareli Salazar Vázquez (born 8 December 1996 in Culiacán, Sinaloa) is a Mexican road and track cyclist, who currently rides for UCI Women's Continental Team .

She won at the 2014 Central American and Caribbean Games the points race and won silver in the team pursuit and scratch. She represented her nation at the 2015 UCI Track Cycling World Championships.

Major results
2014
Central American and Caribbean Games
1st  Points Race
2nd  Scratch Race
2nd  Team Pursuit (with Jessica Bonilla, Íngrid Drexel and Mayra del Rocio Rocha)
2nd  Scratch Race, Pan American Track Championships
2nd Scratch Race, Copa Internacional de Pista (U23)
3rd Scratch Race, Copa Internacional de Pista
2015
3rd  Team Pursuit, Pan American Games (with Sofía Arreola, Mayra del Rocio Rocha and Íngrid Drexel)
2016
Pan American Track Championships
1st  Scratch Race 
2nd  Omnium
2nd  Team Pursuit (with Sofía Arreola, Jessica Bonilla and Mayra Del Rocio Rocha)
Copa Guatemala de Ciclismo de Pista
1st Points Race
1st Omnium
2nd Scratch Race
3rd 500m Time Trial
2018
2nd Omnium, International Belgian Track Meeting

References

External links

1996 births
Mexican female cyclists
Living people
Cyclists at the 2015 Pan American Games
Sportspeople from Culiacán
Pan American Games medalists in cycling
Pan American Games bronze medalists for Mexico
Cyclists at the 2019 Pan American Games
Pan American Games silver medalists for Mexico
Medalists at the 2015 Pan American Games
Medalists at the 2019 Pan American Games
Olympic cyclists of Mexico
Cyclists at the 2020 Summer Olympics
21st-century Mexican women
20th-century Mexican women
Competitors at the 2014 Central American and Caribbean Games
Competitors at the 2018 Central American and Caribbean Games